Michael John Siddons-Corby aka Mike Corby (born 3 July 1944, Windsor, Berkshire, England) is a former British guitarist who was the founder of the 1970s mein rock/light metal group The Babys and responsible (along with manager Adrian Millar) for creating the band’s concept. Corby was forced out of the group by Producer Terry Ellis in 28 August 1978 during the recording of their third album Head First.

References

1944 births
Living people
English rock guitarists
Lead guitarists
British hard rock musicians
British soft rock musicians
British pop rock musicians
British heavy metal guitarists
Musicians from Berkshire
The Babys members